An Alfvén resonator or Ionosphere Alfvén resonator is a spectral resonance structure found within geomagnetic fields in the frequency range of 0.1–10 Hz. First reported in 1989, they are ionospheric short-period geomagnetic variations primarily seen as nighttime phenomena and rarely observed during the day.

See also 
 Earth–ionosphere waveguide

References 

Physical chemistry
Ionosphere